The Lord Chancellor of Scotland, formally the Lord High Chancellor, was a Great Officer of State in the Kingdom of Scotland.

Holders of the office are known from 1123 onwards, but its duties were occasionally performed by an official of lower status with the title of Keeper of the Great Seal. From the 15th century, the Chancellor was normally a Bishop or a Peer.

At the Union, the Lord Keeper of the Great Seal of England became the first Lord High Chancellor of Great Britain, but the Earl of Seafield continued as Lord Chancellor of Scotland until 1708. He was re-appointed in 1713 and sat as an Extraordinary Lord of Session in that capacity until his death in 1730.

List of Lords Chancellors of Scotland

David I
 1124-1126: John Capellanus
 1126-1143: Herbert of Selkirk
 bef.1143-1145:  Edward, Bishop of Aberdeen
 c.1147–c.1150:  William Cumin
 bef.1150-1153: Walter, possibly Walter fitz Alan

Malcolm IV
 1153–1165:  Enguerrand, Bishop of Glasgow

William I
 1165-1171:  Nicholas
 c.1171-1178:  Walter de Bidun, Bishop of Dunkeld
 c.1178–1189:  Roger de Beaumont, Bishop of St Andrews
 1189–1199:  Hugh de Roxburgh, Bishop of Glasgow
 1199–1202:  William de Malveisin, Bishop of Glasgow
 1203-1210:  Florence of Holland, Bishop-elect of Glasgow
 1211-1224:  William del Bois, Archdeacon of Lothian

Alexander II
 1226-1227:  Thomas de Stirling, Archdeacon of Glasgow
 1227-1230:  Matthew the Scot, Bishop-elect of Dunkeld
 1231–1233:  William de Bondington, Bishop of Glasgow
 1233-1249:  Sir William de Lindsay

Alexander III
 1249–1250:  Robert de Keldeleth, Abbot of Dunfermline
 1250-1253:  Gamelin, Bishop of St Andrews
 1256–1257:  Richard de Inverkeithing, Bishop of Dunkeld
 1259-1273:  William Wishart, Bishop of Glasgow
 1273–c.1279:  William Fraser, Bishop of St Andrews
 1285-1291:  Thomas Charteris, Archdeacon of Lothian

English Appointees during the Interregnum
 1291:  Alan de St Edmund, Bishop of Caithness
 1292:  William de Dumfries
 1292:  Alan de Dumfries
 1294-1295: Thomas de Hunsinghore
 1295-1296: Alexander Kennedy
 1296-1304?: Walter de Amersham
 c.1301–c.1305:  Nicholas de Balmyle, Bishop of Dunblane
 1304-1306: William de Bevercotes

Robert I
 1308–1328:  Bernard, Abbot of Arbroath (later Bishop of the Isles)

David II
 1328-1329:  Walter de Twynham, Rector of Glasgow Primo
 1329-1332:  Adam de Moravia, Bishop of Brechin
 1338-1341: William Bullock, Chancellor to Edward Baliol
 1342: William de Bosco
 1335x1340–1346:  Sir Thomas Charteris
 1350-1352:  William Caldwell
 1353–1370:  Patrick de Leuchars, Bishop of Brechin

Robert II
 1370–1377:  John de Carrick, Bishop-elect of Dunkeld
 1377–1390:  John de Peebles, Bishop of Dunkeld

Robert III
 1394:       Duncan Petit, Archdeacon of Glasgow
 1396-1421:  Gilbert de Greenlaw, Bishop of Aberdeen

James I
 1422–1425:  William Lauder, Bishop of Glasgow
 1426–1439:  John Cameron, Bishop of Glasgow

James II
 1439–c.1444:  William Crichton, 1st Lord Crichton
 1444:       James Kennedy, Archbishop of Saint Andrews
 1444-1447:  James Bruce, Bishop of Dunkeld and Glasgow
 1447–1453:  William Crichton, 1st Lord Crichton,
 1454–1456:  William Sinclair, Earl of Orkney and Caithness
 1457–1460: George Shoreswood, Bishop of Brechin

James III
 1460–1482:  Andrew Stewart, 1st Lord Avandale
 1482–1483:  John Laing, Bishop of Glasgow
 1483:       James Livingstone, Bishop of Dunkeld
 1483–1488:  Colin Campbell, 1st Earl of Argyll

James IV
 1488 (Feb–Jun):  William Elphinstone, Bishop of Aberdeen
 1488–1492:  Colin Campbell, 1st Earl of Argyll
 1493–1497:  Archibald Douglas, 5th Earl of Angus
 1497–1501:  George Gordon, 2nd Earl of Huntly
 1501–1504:  James Stewart, Duke of Ross
 1510–1513:  Alexander Stewart (d. 1513), Archbishop of St Andrews

James V
 1513–1526:  James Beaton, Archbishop of Glasgow (later Archbishop of St Andrews)
 1527–1528:  Archibald Douglas, 6th Earl of Angus
 1528–1543:  Gavin Dunbar, Archbishop of Glasgow

Mary I
 1543–1546:  David Beaton, Archbishop of St Andrews
 1546–1562:  George Gordon, 4th Earl of Huntly
 1563–1566:  James Douglas, 4th Earl of Morton
 1566–1567:  George Gordon, 5th Earl of Huntly

James VI
 1567–1573:  James Douglas, 4th Earl of Morton
 1573 (Jan–Sep):  Archibald Campbell, 5th Earl of Argyll
 1573–1578:  John Lyon, 8th Lord Glamis
 1578–1579:  John Stewart, 4th Earl of Atholl
 1579–1584:  Colin Campbell, 6th Earl of Argyll
 1584–1585:  James Stewart, Earl of Arran
 1586–1595:  John Maitland, 1st Lord Maitland of Thirlestane
 1599–1604:  John Graham, 3rd Earl of Montrose
 1604–1622:  Alexander Seton, 1st Earl of Dunfermline
 1622–1634:  George Hay, 1st Earl of Kinnoull

Charles I
 1635–1638:  John Spottiswoode, Archbishop of St Andrews
 1638–1641:  James Hamilton, 1st Duke of Hamilton
 1641–1660:  John Campbell, 1st Earl of Loudoun

Charles II
 1660–1664:  William Cunningham, 9th Earl of Glencairn
 1664–1681:  John Leslie, 7th Earl of Rothes (1st Duke of Rothes from 29 May 1680)
 1681-1682:  Office vacant
 1682–1684:  George Gordon, 1st Earl of Aberdeen

James VII
 1684–1689:  James Drummond, 4th Earl of Perth

William III and Mary II
 1689-1692:  In commission
 1692–1696:  John Hay, 1st Marquess of Tweeddale
 1696–1702:  Patrick Hume, 1st Earl of Marchmont

Anne
 1702–1704:  James Ogilvy, 1st Earl of Seafield
 1704–1705:  John Hay, 2nd Marquess of Tweeddale
 1705–1707:  James Ogilvy, 1st Earl of Seafield

See also
 Director of Chancery
 Privy Council of Scotland
 Treasurer of Scotland
 Treasurer-depute of Scotland
 Secretary of State, Scotland
 List of Masters of Requests

References

Notes

Sources
Cowan, Samuel, The Lord Chancellors of Scotland Edinburgh 1911. 
 "Lord chancellors of Scotland in the Oxford DNB", in the Oxford Dictionary of National Biography, Oxford University Press, Sept 2004; online edn, Jan 2007 accessed 20 Feb 2007
 Dowden, John, The Bishops of Scotland, ed. J. Maitland Thomson, (Glasgow, 1912)

Members of the Privy Council of Scotland
Political office-holders in Scotland
 
Lord Chancellor